Siti Noor Iasah binti Mohamad Ariffin (born 22 September 1989) is a Malaysian paralympic athlete who competing mainly in category T20 in sprinting and long jump events in international level events.

She competed at the 2016 Summer Paralympics and 2020 Summer Paralympics.

References

External links
 

Paralympic athletes of Malaysia
Living people
1989 births
People from Johor
Malaysian Muslims
Malaysian people of Malay descent
Track and field athletes with disabilities
Intellectual Disability category Paralympic competitors
Competitors in athletics with intellectual disability
Athletes (track and field) at the 2016 Summer Paralympics
Athletes (track and field) at the 2020 Summer Paralympics
Malaysian female sprinters
Malaysian long jumpers